The Lithuanian Gay League (LGL) is the only non-governmental organization in Lithuania exclusively representing the interests of the local LGBT* community. The LGL association is one of the most stable and mature organizations within the civic sector in the country, as it was founded on 3 December 1993. The main principle, characterizing the activities of the association, is the principle of independence from any political or financial interests with the view of attaining effective social inclusion and integration of the local LGBT* community in Lithuania. Based on its expertise in the fields of advocacy, awareness raising and community building, accumulated during twenty years of organizational existence, LGL strives for the consistent progress in the field of human rights for LGBT* people.

Activities 

The key activities of the organization are

 to supervise the implementation of the voluntarily accepted international human rights obligations regarding LGBT* individuals by the Republic of Lithuania,  
 to stop homo-, bi- and transphobic legislative initiatives and to promote the adoption of LGBT* inclusive laws and policies, and  
 to eradicate institutional discrimination against LGBT* individuals.

However, formal legal equality does not automatically translate into an improvement of quality of life. Openness, a sense of communal belonging and identification of concrete goals represent the key to success in the pursuit of the empowerment of LGBT* individuals in Lithuania.

LGL actively works in multiple fields affecting various aspects of LGBT* lives in Lithuania. The right to freedom of expression is being protected through the challenging application of the Lithuanian ‘homosexual propaganda’ law through various legal avenues, developing awareness raising campaigns and supplementing public discourse with LGBT*-related positive information. The right to freedom of peaceful assembly is being exercised through organizing large scale public awareness raising events, such as the annual Rainbow Days and the Baltic Pride festival (taking place once every three years). Community engagement is being ensured through the development of the volunteerism segment within the activities of the organization and through organizing various conferences, seminars, workshops and other cultural events for the local community members. The preventive strategies against homophobic and transphobic hate crimes are implemented through monitoring and documenting hate motivated incidents, training law enforcement officials and raising awareness among the community members encouraging to report witnessed or experienced hate crimes. Finally, advocacy on an international level is being implemented through submitting shadow reports to the international human rights protection mechanisms, issuing the organization’s newsletter (more than 6,000 international subscribers) and participating in the activities of the regional LGBT* networks.

The LGL's team consists of five board members, seven staff members, two international volunteers (participating in the activities of the organization within the framework of the European Voluntary Service) and more than 20 local and international volunteers. LGL's team encourages new members to join and contribute ideas and projects. Allies join LGBT* community members in the activities of the organization.

The office of the association LGL is located in Vilnius, Pylimo str. 21. This is the space where the LGL's team is implementing various projects, organizing meetings and constantly inviting the members of the local LGBT* community and their supporters to attend various events. The LGL's office is also home for the sole LGBT* Center in the country. The LGBT* Center hosts a library in relation to the organization’s activities. Free internet access is provided and people are always welcome to come by for a cup of coffee or tea. The LGBT* Center is open for all well-meaning visitors, who are willing to know more about the organization’s activities and about the situation of the LGBT* human rights in Lithuania.

The LGL is a member organization of the National Equality and Diversity Forum and the Human Rights Coalition. LGL also takes part in international cooperation within the framework of international umbrella organizations, such as the International Lesbian and Gay Association, the IGLYO, the European Pride Organizers Association, and Transgender Europe (TGEU). LGL's strategic objectives can be achieved only through positioning the LGBT* rights issue within the broader discourse of human rights; therefore, LGL actively supports various initiatives both on national and international levels.

History 

Shortly its independence was restored, Lithuania decriminalized consensual sexual relations between men. Before the amendment of the criminal code in 1993, such relations were punishable by multi-year prison sentences.  However, despite this progress, "Lithuanian homosexuals were still living 'underground', unable to be themselves, stigmatized by the media as HIV/AIDS spreaders", as leaders of the national LGBT rights movement Vladimir Simonko and Eduardas Platovas recall. 

In order to combat such discrimination, Simonko and Platovas opened the 'Amsterdam' club in Vilnius in 1993 and published the newspaper Amsterdam in 1994. In April 1994, the two organized the first International Lesbian and Gay Association (ILGA) East Europe conference, which took place in the Lithuanian town of Palanga.  This event was especially significant because it was the first conference of that nature to be hosted in a post-Soviet state. Simonko and Platovas officially founded the Lithuanian Gay League in 1995, and the organization has since served as the only organization in the country exclusively fighting for the promotion of LGBT* rights.

See also 
 LGBT rights in Lithuania

References

External links 
  (EN)
 National Equality and Diversity Forum
 Transgender Europe
 LGL Annual Report for 2014

LGBT organizations based in Europe
Non-profit organizations based in Lithuania
LGBT in Lithuania